Mahakaran metro station, also known as New Mahakaran metro station (both are officially correct), is a station of Line 2 (East-West Metro) of the Kolkata Metro, located in B.B.D. Bagh area. There are many British heritage buildings near the station with the Lal Dighi adjoining it. The tracks leaving the station towards Howrah go underneath the Hooghly river through the biggest underwater metro tunnel of India.

The Station

Layout

See also
List of Kolkata Metro stations

References 

Kolkata Metro stations
Railway stations in Kolkata